An episcopal conference, sometimes called a conference of bishops, is an official assembly of the bishops of the Catholic Church in a given territory. Episcopal conferences have long existed as informal entities.  The first assembly of bishops to meet regularly, with its own legal structure and ecclesial leadership function, is the Swiss Bishops' Conference, which was founded in 1863. More than forty episcopal conferences existed before the Second Vatican Council.  Their status was confirmed by the Second Vatican Council and further defined by Pope Paul VI's 1966 motu proprio, Ecclesiae sanctae.

Episcopal conferences are generally defined by geographic borders, often national ones, with all the bishops in a given country belonging to the same conference, although they may also include neighboring countries. Certain authority and tasks are assigned to episcopal conferences, particularly with regard to setting the liturgical norms for the Mass. Episcopal conferences receive their authority under universal law or particular mandates. In certain circumstances, as defined by canon law, the decisions of an episcopal conference are subject to ratification from the Holy See. Individual bishops do not relinquish their immediate authority for the governance of their respective dioceses to the conference.

Theological and juridical status

The operation, authority, and responsibilities of episcopal conferences are currently governed by the 1983 Code of Canon Law (see especially canons 447–459) In addition, there are assemblies of bishops which include the bishops of different rites in a nation, both Eastern Catholic and Latin Catholic; these are described in canon 322 §2 of the Code of Canons of the Eastern Churches.

In the 2013 apostolic exhortation, Evangelii Gaudium, Pope Francis expressed his concern that the intent of the Second Vatican Council, which would give episcopal conferences "genuine doctrinal authority, has not yet been sufficiently elaborated."  On September 9, 2017, Pope Francis modified canon law, granting episcopal conferences specific authority  "to faithfully prepare … approve and publish the liturgical books for the regions for which they are responsible after the confirmation of the Apostolic See."  The Congregation for Divine Worship and the Discipline of the Sacraments, which formerly had primary responsibility for translations, was ordered to "help the Episcopal Conferences to fulfil their task."  On October 22, 2017, the Holy See released a letter that Pope Francis had sent to the Prefect of the Congregation for Divine Worship and the Discipline of the Sacraments, Cardinal Robert Sarah, clarifying that the Holy See and its departments would have only limited authority to confirm liturgical translations recognized by a local episcopal conference.  In late February, 2018, the Council of Cardinals and Pope Francis undertook a consideration of the theological status of episcopal conferences, re-reading Pope John Paul II's Apostolos Suos in the light of Pope Francis's Evangelii Gaudium.

List of episcopal conferences

National episcopal conferences
Source:

Africa
Episcopal Conference of Angola and São Tomé
Episcopal Conference of Benin
Conference of Bishops of Burkina Faso and of Niger
Conference of Catholic Bishops of Burundi
National Episcopal Conference of Cameroon
Central African Episcopal Conference
Episcopal Conference of Chad
Episcopal Conference of the Congo
Episcopal Conference of the Democratic Republic of the Congo
Episcopal Conference of the Côte d'Ivoire
Episcopal Conference of Equatorial Guinea
Assembly of Catholic Hierarchs of Ethiopia and Eritrea
Episcopal Conference of Gabon
Inter-territorial Catholic Bishops' Conference of The Gambia and Sierra Leone
Ghana Bishops' Conference
Episcopal Conference of Guinea
Episcopal Conference of the Indian Ocean
Kenya Conference of Catholic Bishops
Lesotho Catholic Bishops' Conference
Catholic Bishops' Conference of Liberia
Episcopal Conference of Madagascar
Episcopal Conference of Malawi
Episcopal Conference of Mali
Episcopal Conference of Mozambique
Namibian Catholic Bishops' Conference
Catholic Bishops' Conference of Nigeria
Regional Episcopal Conference of North Africa
Conference of Catholic Bishops of Rwanda
Conference of Bishops of Senegal, Mauritania, Cape Verde, and Guinea Bissau
Southern African Catholic Bishops' Conference (SACBC)
Sudan Catholic Bishops' Conference
Tanzania Episcopal Conference
Episcopal Conference of Togo
Uganda Episcopal Conference
Zambia Episcopal Conference
Zimbabwe Catholic Bishops' Conference

Asia

Conference of the Latin Bishops of the Arab Regions
Catholic Bishops' Conference of Bangladesh
Bishops' Conference of Central Asia (includes the bishops of Kazakhstan, Kyrgyzstan, Tajikistan, Turkmenistan and Uzbekistan)
Chinese Regional Bishops' Conference
Conference of Catholic Bishops of India (CCBI)
Bishops' Conference of Indonesia (KWI)
Catholic Bishops' Conference of Japan
Catholic Bishops' Conference of Korea
Episcopal Conference of Laos and Cambodia
Catholic Bishops' Conference of Malaysia, Singapore and Brunei (CBCMSB)
Catholic Bishops' Conference of Myanmar
Catholic Bishops' Conference of Pakistan
Catholic Bishops' Conference of the Philippines
Catholic Bishops' Conference of Thailand
Episcopal Conference of Turkey
Catholic Bishops' Conference of Sri Lanka
Catholic Bishops' Conference of Vietnam

Europe

Episcopal Conference of Albania
Austrian Bishops' Conference
Conference of Catholic Bishops of Belarus
Episcopal Conference of Belgium
Bishops' Conference of Bosnia and Herzegovina
Episcopal Conference of Bulgaria
Croatian Bishops' Conference
Czech Bishops' Conference
Catholic Bishops' Conference of England and Wales
Bishops' Conference of France (CEF)
German Bishops' Conference
Holy Synod of Catholic Bishops of Greece
Catholic Bishops' Conference of Hungary
Irish Catholic Bishops' Conference
Italian Episcopal Conference (CEI)
Latvian Bishops' Conference
Lithuanian Bishops' Conference 
Maltese Episcopal Conference
Bishops' Conference of the Netherlands
Polish Episcopal Conference
Portuguese Episcopal Conference
Romanian Episcopal Conference
Conference of Catholic Bishops of the Russian Federation
International Bishops' Conference of Saints Cyril and Methodius (called "Bishops' Conference of the Federal Republic of Yugoslavia" between 1997 and 2005. Includes the bishops of Serbia, Montenegro, Kosovo, and Macedonia.)
Bishops' Conference of Yugoslavia (1918—1993)
Scandinavian Bishops Conference (includes the bishops of Denmark, Finland, Iceland, Norway and Sweden)
Bishops' Conference of Scotland
Conference of Slovak Bishops
Slovenian Bishops' Conference
Spanish Episcopal Conference
Swiss Bishops Conference
Ukrainian Episcopal Conference

Oceania
Australian Catholic Bishops Conference
New Zealand Catholic Bishops' Conference
Episcopal Conference of the Pacific (C.E. PAC.)
Catholic Bishops' Conference of Papua New Guinea and Solomon Islands

North America

Antilles Episcopal Conference
Canadian Conference of Catholic Bishops (CCCB)
Episcopal Conference of Costa Rica
Conference of Catholic Bishops of Cuba
Conference of the Dominican Episcopate (CED)
Episcopal Conference of El Salvador
Episcopal Conference of Guatemala
Episcopal Conference of Haiti
Episcopal Conference of Honduras
Conference of the Mexican Episcopate (CEM)
Episcopal Conference of Nicaragua
Episcopal Conference of Panama
Puerto Rican Episcopal Conference (CEP)
United States Conference of Catholic Bishops (USCCB)

South America
Argentine Episcopal Conference (CEA)
Bolivian Episcopal Conference
National Conference of Bishops of Brazil (CNBB)
Episcopal Conference of Chile (CECh)
Episcopal Conference of Colombia
Ecuadorian Episcopal Conference
Paraguayan Episcopal Conference
Peruvian Episcopal Conference
Episcopal Conference of Uruguay
Venezuelan Episcopal Conference

Other episcopal bodies
In addition to the episcopal conferences as defined by the Holy See, there are a number of other regional groupings of bishops:

Synods of eastern rite churches
Synods of Bishops of the Patriarchal and Major Archiepiscopal Churches

Synod of the Armenian Catholic Church
Synod of the Chaldean Church
Synod of the Catholic Coptic Church
Synod of the Greek-Catholic Ukrainian Church
Synod of the Greek-Melkite Catholic Church
Synod of the Romanian Church
Synod of the Syrian Catholic Church
Synod of the Syro-Malabarese Church
Synod of the Syro-Malankarese Church
Council of the Ethiopian Church
Council of the Ruthenian Church, U.S.A.
Council of the Slovakian Church

Assemblies of bishops
National assemblies of Hierarchs of Churches Sui Iuris (including eastern Catholic as well as Latin ordinaries)

Assembly of the Catholic Hierarchy of Egypt
Assembly of the Catholic Bishops of Iraq
Assembly of the Patriarchs and Bishops of Lebanon
Assembly of the Catholic Hierarchs of Syria
Assembly of the Catholic Ordinaries of the Holy Land
Iranian Episcopal Conference
Catholic Bishops' Conference of India (CBCI)

International Meetings of Episcopal Conferences
Council of Catholic Patriarchs of the East
Symposium of Episcopal Conferences of Africa and Madagascar
Regional Episcopal Conference of Francophone West Africa
Association of Episcopal Conferences of Central Africa
Association of Episcopal Conferences of the Region of Central Africa
Association of Member Episcopal Conferences in Eastern Africa
Inter-Regional Meeting of Bishops of Southern Africa
Reunion of Episcopal Conferences of West Africa
Federation of Asian Bishops' Conferences
Federation of Catholic Bishops' Conferences of Oceania (FCBCO)
Council of European Bishops' Conferences (CCEE)
Commission of the Bishops' Conferences of the European Community (COMECE) 
Latin American Episcopal Council (CELAM)
Episcopal Secretariate of Central America and Panama

See also

Catholic Church hierarchy
Collegiality in the Catholic Church
Episcopal see
Roman Curia
Dicastery

References

Further reading

External links
List of all episcopal conferences by Giga-Catholic Information
The Hierarchy of the Catholic Church by David M. Cheney

 
Catholic canonical structures